Blaesodiplosis is a genus of gall midges in the family Cecidomyiidae. There are at least four described species in Blaesodiplosis.

Species
These four species belong to the genus Blaesodiplosis:
 Blaesodiplosis canadensis (Felt, 1908) i c g
 Blaesodiplosis crataegibedeguar (Osten Sacken, 1878) c g
 Blaesodiplosis crataegifolia (Felt, 1907) i c g b
 Blaesodiplosis venae (Stebbins, 1910) i c g
Data sources: i = ITIS, c = Catalogue of Life, g = GBIF, b = Bugguide.net

References

Further reading

 
 
 
 
 

Cecidomyiinae
Articles created by Qbugbot
Sciaroidea genera